Patrick Baumann (5 August 196713 October 2018) was a Swiss basketball executive, player and coach. He was the President of the Global Association of International Sports Federations and Secretary General of the International Basketball Federation (FIBA). He was posthumously inducted into the Basketball Hall of Fame in 2020.

Background
Baumann was born in Basel on 5 August 1967. He was involved in many aspects of the basketball world. He played basketball while in Italy and also served as a referee. In Switzerland, he trained referees, coached a basketball team, ran clinics and organized tournaments.

FIBA
Baumann joined FIBA in 1994 and became the Deputy Secretary General in 1995. He was elevated to the position of Secretary General in 2002, with his term officially starting in 2003.

While Secretary General of FIBA, Baumann supported the growth of 3x3 basketball. This format was used at the Nanjing 2014 Youth Olympic Games and was used in the under 18 will championships in 2015 Israel.

Education
 1987 – Maturità Classica, Sanremo, Italy
 1990 – Law Degree University of Lausanne Switzerland
 1996 – Master in Sport Administration Management University of Lyon, France
 2001 – MBS University of Chicago, Chicago

Death
Baumann died of a heart attack while attending the 2018 Youth Olympics in Buenos Aires, Argentina, on 13 October 2018.

References

External links
 Tribute to Patrick Baumann
 FIBA mourns passing of Secretary General and IOC Member Patrick Baumann

1967 births
2018 deaths
Basketball executives
Basketball referees
International Olympic Committee members
Naismith Memorial Basketball Hall of Fame inductees
Sportspeople from Basel-Stadt
Swiss basketball coaches
Swiss men's basketball players
University of Chicago Booth School of Business alumni
University of Lausanne alumni
University of Lyon alumni